Central University of Rajasthan (CURAJ) is a central university located in Ajmer, Rajasthan, India. CURAJ has 12 schools, 30 academic departments and one community college covering technology, science, humanities, commerce, management, public policy and social science programs with a strong emphasis on scientific, technological and social education as well as research. Total student enrollment at the university exceeds 1700 and includes students from over 23 states.

History
CURAJ was established by an Act of Parliament as a central university on 3 March 2009. The university was started in 2009-10 with two PG programmes namely M.Sc./M.A. statistics (actuarial) and M.Sc.Tech. mathematics in Malaviya National Institute of Technology, Jaipur. It shifted to R.K. Patni College, Kishangarh in 2010-11 and started six new PG programmes. In 2012-13, the university moved to its present location, on Jaipur-Ajmer Expressway (NH-8) at Bandar Sindri village of Ajmer district.

Doctoral and undergraduate programmes were started in 2013-14.

Campus
This land was donated by the Government of Rajasthan in 2010, construction started in 2011 and by July 2012 the university had moved to its current location. The nearest commuter railway station is Kishangarh Station and the nearest major railway station is the Ajmer Station.

The campus is in developing phase. The departments are functioning from temporary buildings and expected to move to their permanent places in 2016. An air conditioned auditorium with a capacity of 1500 has been constructed on the temporary basis. The construction of the guest house is completed. The university has constructed the state-of-the-art permanent buildings for hostels and implemented the concept of rainwater harvesting successfully by creating seven ponds in the campus at different locations and a sewage treatment plant has also been constructed at the periphery whose outlet is used in watering plants.

The buildings are constructed using a fusion of traditional architectural features of Rajasthan with contemporary design elements. The chhatri and jaali are used in the buildings to give a unique blend of the traditional and modern architecture.

Sports facilities
The university has a football ground, a cricket ground, two basketball courts, two volleyball grounds and many fields for various other sports.

Library
The university library has more than 31,000 books including references and subscribed more than 8000 online journals under e-ShodhSindhu (UGC- INFONET Digital Library) Consortium and more than 2,000 online journals being subscribed by the university library i.e. Science Direct, SciFinder, Bentham Science, EBSCO, ACM Digital Library & IEEE online journals. More than 100 national & international print journals also being subscribed by the university library.

Organisation and administration

Governance

Schools and departments
The university is organised into twelve schools, each of which has several departments:

Academics

Programmes 
CURAJ offers academic and research programmes in technology, science, humanities, commerce, management, public policy and social sciences. This includes five year integrated M.Sc. programmes in various fields, leading to the degree of B.Sc. and M.Sc. These programmes have four core subjects in the 1st and 2nd year (semester I - IV), and only one subject as major (like honors degree) in 3rd year (semester V & VI) in which the student will pursue the M.Sc. degree.

The university offers various PG programmes with specialization, M. A. programmes, M.Sc. programmes and three-year Integrated M.Sc. B.Ed programmes.

Admissions
The university admits students to integrated M.Sc., integrated M.Sc.-B.Ed and PG programmes through the Common University Entrance Test (CUET) held yearly, and conducted at centers all over India. Admission to M. Tech. programme is made once a year on the basis of GATE score through centralized counselling for M.Tech./M.Arch./M.Plan.. Admission to the doctoral programmes were accomplished through the CUET and followed by an interview.

Admission to B.Voc. (interior design) programme is done through an aptitude test conducted by the university.

The university coordinates CUET each year from its introduction. In 2017, ten universities are taking part in CUET, including CURAJ. Other universities are Central University of Haryana, Central University of Jammu, Central University of Jharkhand, Central University of Karnataka, Central University of Kashmir, Central University of Kerala, Central University of Punjab, Central University of South Bihar, Central University of Tamil Nadu, Mahatma Gandhi Central University and Assam University.

Research 
The university offers Ph.D. programs in each department.

Rankings

Central University of Rajasthan was ranked in the 151–200 band by the National Institutional Ranking Framework (NIRF) universities ranking of 2022.

Student life

Besides academics, a range of societies and clubs exist for students like the student-run University Magazine called उdaan, the film club, the music club, the dance club, the photography club known as the Lenswala, The Mathletes, the Navsrijan Society and the Economics Society of CURAJ. The annual cultural fest is known as Marukriti. Math Earth, the Economania, Impresario and Myriad Hues are the annual fests of the respective department and student societies of the university. The university's students also participate in regional and national level inter-university fests and competitions like the Association of Indian Universities annual fest known as UNIFEST.

Halls of residence
There are 6 residences (hostels), including 2 hostels for UG and PG male students, 2 hostels for UG and PG female students, one hostel for male research scholars, teaching and non-teaching staff and one hostel for female research scholars, teaching and non-teaching staff.

See also
 Ajmer
 Jaipur
 Banaras Hindu University
 Jawaharlal Nehru University
 Malaviya National Institute of Technology
 University of Rajasthan

References

External links
 

 
Central universities in India
Universities and colleges in Ajmer
Educational institutions established in 2009
2009 establishments in Rajasthan
Kishangarh
Universities in Rajasthan